"Material Boy (Don't Look Back)" is a dance-pop song performed by German singer Jeanette. The song was written by Thomas Troelsen and Remee and produced by Vacuum for Jeanette's seventh album Undress to the Beat (2009). It was released as a single on 29 May 2009 in Germany.

Formats and track listings
These are the formats and track listings of major single releases of "Material Boy (Don't Look Back)".

Premium CD single
(Released 29 May 2009)
"Material Boy (Don't Look Back)" (Single version) – 4:05
"Material Boy (Don't Look Back)" (Micha Moor remix) – 6:32
 Bonus Magnet Pin

CD single
(Released 29 May 2009)
"Material Boy (Don't Look Back)" (Single version) – 4:05
"Material Boy (Don't Look Back)" (Album version) – 4:18

Digital EP
(Released 29 May 2009)
"Material Boy (Don't Look Back)" (Single version) – 4:05
"Material Boy (Don't Look Back)" (Album version) – 4:18
"Material Boy (Don't Look Back)" (Extended version) – 5:40

Charts

References

External links
Official website

2009 singles
Jeanette Biedermann songs
Songs written by Thomas Troelsen
Songs written by Remee
2009 songs
Universal Music Group singles